The 117 Squadron of the Israeli Air Force, also known as the First Jet Squadron, is a training squadron for F-35I 'Adir' fighter pilots, based at Nevatim Airbase.

Before it closed in September 2020 after 67 years of service, the 117th was an F-16C fighter squadron based at Ramat David Airbase. The squadron operated Israel's first jet fighter, the Gloster Meteor, flying the T7, F8 and FR9 variants.

On 6 July 2021, Airforce Technology reported that the Israeli Air Force had re-established the 117th First Jet Squadron as a training squadron in the IAF’s F-35I ‘Adir’ division, and that it was to be based at Nevatim airbase in the Negev. Initially, the squadron would focus on training IAF pilots to operate the F-35I. The course would help pilots get accustomed to the aircraft’s parts and systems, and perform simulator flights, ground drills, and training sorties. It would also serve as a training center for the operational squadrons of the Adir Division.

References

Israeli Air Force squadrons